Cerro Silvestre  is a corregimiento in Arraiján District, Panamá Oeste Province, Panama with a population of 23,592 as of 2010. It was created by Law 42 of April 30, 2003.

References

Corregimientos of Panamá Oeste Province